is a Japanese Shinto practice of ritual purification by washing the entire body.

Background
Every year, many people take pilgrimages to sacred waterfalls, lakes and rivers, either alone or in small groups, to perform misogi. Mount Ontake, the Kii mountain range and Mount Yoshino are but a few examples of ancient and well known areas for misogi in Japan. In Kyoto, people douse themselves under Kiyomizu Temple's Otowa no taki (Sound-of-Wings) waterfall, although the majority of visitors drink from the waters rather than plunging into them.  In the United States misogi is performed at the Tsubaki Grand Shrine of America at the Konryu Myojin no Taki waterfall each morning.

Before encountering misogi, members generally undergo some sort of preliminary purification. Such things as prayers, fasting, or some sort of physical activity is common. Generally, women put on a special white kimono and men put on a fundoshi (loincloth), with both genders also wearing headbands. They then begin  or "spirit shaking" by clenching their hands in front of the stomach and shaking them up and down, vibrating the upper torso. The purpose of this is to become aware of/unified with the spirit's presence within. Following this is a "warm-up" or calisthenics ( or "bird boat" rowing). These two aforementioned practices are sometimes accompanied by special prayers or incantations. After, the leader begins to speak out invocations/prayers that are said to activate the spirit. The followers generally speak along with them, thus affirming the potential for realizing one's own spirit, and thus unifying them with the kami around them.
 
The above exercises are done so participants raise their metabolism and some groups accompany this with deep breathing. They may be sprinkled with purifying salt and may be given sake to spit into the waterfall in three mouthfuls. Sometimes the participants are given salt to throw into the waterfall as they enter. In some groups, the leader counts to nine and then cuts the air while shouting the word "yei! to dispel this impurity. The participants then enter the waterfall while continuously chanting the phrase . This phrase asks the kami to wash away the impurity from the six elements that make up the human being, the five senses and the mind. The practice of this varies from group to group, each having their own traditions or methods.

Misogi is also used in some forms of martial arts, especially aikido, to prepare the mind for training and to learn how to develop one's Dantian, or centre. The founder of aikido, Morihei Ueshiba, regularly used this form of meditation to complement his training and search for perfection. The Sen Shin tei Misogi Well at Ki Society Headquarters in Japan is a well-known place for people performing misogi with cold water before sunrise.

See also
 Temizuya, a pavilion for ritual purification at the entrance to Shinto shrines
 Hydrotherapy
 Cryotherapy
 Contrast bath therapy
 Baptism
 Ghusl
 Mikveh

References

Further reading
 Fisher, Mary Pat. Living Religions, 5th ed. Prentice Hall.
 Examples of different Misogi & Takigyo practices from the Yamabushi Christian Grübl (Austria)

Bathing in Japan
Ritual purification
Shinto
Shinto in Japan
Exorcism in Shinto